Salix lapponum, the downy willow, is a low, much-branched shrub having a wide distribution in Northern Europe, eastwards to the Altai and western Siberia, and is found as far south as the Pyrenees and Bulgaria.

As described in Stace and BSBI Salix lapponum has the following characteristics:
 Twigs hairy at first, hairless and rather glossy dark reddish brown later.
 Leaves usually lanceolate to 7 cm long by 2.5 cm wide; slightly hairy to hairy on upper side; usually densely hairy on lower side; margins entire or subentire, sometimes a little undulate.
 Petiole short, occasionally up to 1 cm long but usually less than 5mm.

References

lapponum
Flora of Asia
Flora of Europe
Plants described in 1753
Taxa named by Carl Linnaeus